Blaže Koneski (19 December 1921 – 7 December 1993) was a Macedonian poet, writer, literary translator, and linguistic scholar.

His major contribution was to the codification of standard Macedonian. He is the key figure who shaped Macedonian literature and intellectual life in the country however he has also been accused of serbianizing the Macedonian standard language.

Biography

Koneski was born in Nebregovo, in the then province of South Serbia, part of the Kingdom of Serbs, Croats and Slovenes (current day North Macedonia). His family was strongly pro-Serbian and identified as Serbs since Ottoman times, with a long tradition of serving in the Serbian army and Serbian guerrillas, especially his mother's uncle Gligor Sokolović who was a famous Serbian Chetnik voivode. He received a Royal Serbian scholarship to study in the Kragujevac gymnasium or high school. Later, he studied medicine at the University of Belgrade, and then changed to Serbian language and literature. In 1941, after the defeat of Yugoslavia in Aufmarsch 25, he enrolled in the  Faculty of Slavic studies at the Sofia University. After the Bulgarian coup d'état in September 1944, he returned to his native land, before completing his higher education. Here Koneski began working in the department for communist agitprop at the Main Headquarters of the Macedonian Partisans. However, in 1945 at the age of 23 he became one of the most important contributors to the standardization of Macedonian. He worked as a lector in the Macedonian National Theater, but in 1946, he joined the faculty at the Philosophy Department of the Ss. Cyril and Methodius University of Skopje, where he worked until his retirement. In 1957 he received there the title of full professor. At the same time, he taught the subject of the history of the Macedonian language, and during his entire university career he held the position of head of the Department of Macedonian Language and South Slavic Languages. In 1952/1953 he was dean of the Faculty of Philosophy, and in 1958-1960 he was rector of the University of Skopje. Meanwhile Koneski worked as an editor, and was a prolific contributor to the literary journal "Nov Den", the predecessor of the oldest-survived literary journal "Sovremenost", and "Macedonian Language", published by the Institute for Macedonian language.

He became a member of the Macedonian Academy of Sciences and Arts in 1967, and was elected its president in 1967 through 1975. Koneski was also a member of the Zagreb (Croatia), Belgrade (Serbia), Ljubljana (Slovenia) and Łódź (Poland) Academies of Sciences and Arts, and an honorary doctor of the Universities of Chicago, United States, and Kraków in Poland. The American Slavist Victor Friedman would mention Koneski as one of his mentors.

Blaže Koneski died in Skopje on December 7, 1993. He received a state funeral for his distinguished literary career, and for his contributions to the codification of standard Macedonian.

Literary works
Koneski wrote poetry and prose. His most famous collections of poetry are: Mostot, Pesni, Zemjata i ljubovta, Vezilka, Zapisi, Cesmite, Stari i novi pesni, Seizmograf, among others. His collection of short stories Vineyard  is also famous.

Koneski was a distinguished translator of poetry from German, Russian, Slovenian, Serbian and Polish; he translated the works of Njegos, Prešeren, Heine, Blok, Neruda, and others.

Awards and recognitions
Blaze Koneski won a number of literary prizes such as: the AVNOJ prize, the Njegoš prize, the Golden Wreath ("Zlaten Venec") of the Struga Poetry Evenings (in 1981), the Award of the Writer's Union of the USSR, Herder Prize (in 1971) and others.

The Faculty of Philology at the Ss. Cyril and Methodius University of Skopje is named after Blaze Koneski.

Work on standard Macedonian
Koneski is remembered for his work on codifying the Macedonian standard language. He is the author of On Standard Macedonian, Grammar of Standard Macedonian, History of Macedonian, among other works.

He was one of the editors of Macedonian Dictionary.

Criticism
Bulgarian linguists such as Iliya Talev, in his History of the Macedonian Language, have accused Koneski of plagiarizing Kiril Mirchev's Historical Grammar of the Bulgarian Language because both authors analyzed the same corpus of texts. In Bulgaria, he has also been accused of manipulating historical facts for political goals. There has been also claimed the Macedonian standard was Serbianized with the help of Koneski. As a young boy Koneski himself spoke a heavily Serbianized language and was ridiculed for this. According to Christian Voss the turning point in the Serbianization of Macedonian took place in the late 1950s, that coincided with the preparation period for the dictionary of Koneski published between 1961 and 1966. Voss argues that it contains a consistent pro-Serbian bias. When he visited Chicago in 1969 and received the title of "Doctor Honoris Causa" from a local university, letters of protest were sent to the rector by two Albanian intellectuals from Bitola living in Istanbul, claiming the Macedonian language was invented by the Yugoslav Communists to de-Bulgarianize the local Slavs. Today Historical revisionists in the Republic of North Macedonia, who questioned the narrative established in Communist Yugoslavia, have described the process of codifying Macedonian, to which Koneski was an important contributor, as 'Serbianization'. Macedonian nationalists have also accused Koneski and the communist elite of Serbianizing the Macedonian standard language. Similarly, Venko Markovski, who was one of the codifiers of the Macedonian standard, openly accused Koneski of Serbianizing the Macedonian language.

Bibliography

Poetry and prose
Land and Love (poetry, 1948)
Poems (1953)
The Embroideress (poetry, 1955)
The Vineyard (short stories, 1955)
Poems (1963)
Sterna (poetry, 1966), Hand - Shaking (narrative poem, 1969)
Notes (poetry, 1974)
Poems Old and New (poetry, 1979)
Places and Moments (poetry, 1981)
The Fountains (poetry, 1984)
The Epistle (poetry, 1987)
Meeting in Heaven (poetry, 1988)
The Church (poetry 1988)
A Diary after Many Years (prose, 1988)
Golden Peak (poetry, 1989)
Seismograph (poetry, 1989)
The Heavenly River (poems and translations, 1991)
The Black Ram (poetry, 1993)

Academic and other works
Normative Guide with a Dictionary of Standard Macedonian with Krum Tošev (1950)
Grammar of Standard Macedonian (volume 1, 1952)
Standard Macedonian (1959)
A Grammar of Standard Macedonian (volume 2, 1954)
Macedonian Dictionary (1961)
A History of Macedonian (1965)
Macedonian Dictionary (volume 2, edited, 1965)
Macedonian Dictionary (volume 3, 1966)
The Language of the Macedonian Folk Poetry (1971)
Speeches and Essays (1972)
Macedonian Textbooks of 19th Century: Linguistic, Literary, Historical Texts (1986)
Images and Themes (essays, 1987)
The Tikveš Anthology (study, 1987)
Poetry (Konstantin Miladinov), the Way Blaze Koneski Reads It (1989)
Macedonian Locations and Topics (essays, 1991)
The World of the Legend and the Song (essays, 1993)

References

Further reading

 

1921 births
1993 deaths
People from Dolneni Municipality
20th-century poets
20th-century translators
Macedonian communists
Macedonian poets
Macedonists
Macedonian people of Serbian descent
University of Belgrade Faculty of Philology alumni
Members of the Serbian Academy of Sciences and Arts
Academic staff of the Ss. Cyril and Methodius University of Skopje
Struga Poetry Evenings Golden Wreath laureates
Literary translators
Herder Prize recipients
Yugoslav poets
Yugoslav writers